Brainiac is a colloquial adjective used to describe exceptionally intelligent people. It may also refer to:

Culture

Fictional entities
 Brainiac (character), a fictional supervillain in DC Comics, and an enemy of Superman
 Brainiac (story arc), a 2008 storyline in Action Comics
 Brainiac (Smallville), a version of the villain in the TV series Smallville
 Vril Dox also known as Brainiac 2, a DC Comics character
 Brainiac 5, a member of the Legion of Super-Heroes
 Brainiac 8, a superheroine of the Outsiders, who turned into a supervillainess

Television
 Brainiac: Science Abuse, a 2003–2008 British television programme, and its spin-offs:
 Brainiac: History Abuse, aired in 2005
 Brainiac's Test Tube Baby, aired in 2006–2007
 "Brainiac" (Dark Angel), an episode of the television series Dark Angel

Other uses in culture
 Brainiac (band), an American indie rock band in the 1990s, from Dayton, Ohio
 The Brainiac, a 1962 Mexican horror film directed by Chano Urueta
 Brainiac: Adventures in the Curious, Competitive, Compulsive World of Trivia Buffs, a book written by Ken Jennings

Other uses
 Function BRAINIAC, an energy drink, for improving brain function
 Brainiac techniques for improving computer performance, in technology

See also 
 Geniac, an educational toy billed as a computer